Ricardo Guízar Díaz (February 24, 1933 – December 4, 2015) was a Roman Catholic prelate. He served as the bishop of the Roman Catholic Diocese of Atlacomulco from 1984 to 1996 and the Archbishop of the Roman Catholic Archdiocese of Tlalnepantla from 1996 to 2009.

Ordained to the priesthood in 1958, Guíza Díaz was appointed auxiliary bishop of the Roman Catholic Diocese of Puebla de los Ángeles, Mexico in 1979. He was then appointed Bishop of the Roman Catholic Diocese of Altacomulco and then archbishop of the Roman Catholic Archdiocese of Tlalnepantla.

Notes

1933 births
2015 deaths
21st-century Roman Catholic archbishops in Mexico
20th-century Roman Catholic archbishops in Mexico